Caladenia graminifolia, commonly known as the grass-leafed spider orchid is a species of orchid endemic to the  south-west of Western Australia. It has a single glabrous leaf and one or two short-lived, greenish-yellow and red flowers which have a narrow labellum with long teeth on its sides.

Description
The flowers are self-pollinating and are only open for a day or two. The lateral sepals and petals have thickened glandular tips, more prominent on the lateral sepals. Flowering occurs from August to September.

Taxonomy and naming
Caladenia graminifolia was first formally described by Alex George in 1971 and the description was published in Nuytsia from a specimen at Culham Inlet. The specific epithet (graminifolia) is derived from the Latin gramen, graminis meaning "grass" and -folius meaning "-leaved", referring to the grass-like leaf of this orchid.

Distribution and habitat
The grass-leafed spider orchid occurs between Mount Manypeaks and Israelite Bay in the Esperance Plains and Mallee biogeographic regions. It grows in woodland under tall shrubs and sometimes on granite outcrops.

Conservation
Caladenia graminifolia is classified as "Not Threatened" by the Western Australian Government Department of Parks and Wildlife.

References

graminifolia
Orchids of Western Australia
Endemic orchids of Australia
Plants described in 1971
Endemic flora of Western Australia